Nur Mohammad Stadium is located by the Police Super Office, Narail, Bangladesh.

See also
Stadiums in Bangladesh
List of cricket grounds in Bangladesh

References

Football venues in Bangladesh